Gilbertville may refer to:

Canada
 Gilbertville, Ontario, located in Norfolk County
United States
 Gilbertville, Iowa, a city in Black Hawk County
 Gilbertville, Maine, in Oxford County
 Gilbertville, Massachusetts, a village in the town of Hardwick, Worcester County